Potato black ringspot virus (PBRSV) is a plant pathogenic virus of the family Comoviridae.

See also 

 Viral diseases of potato

External links
ICTVdB - The Universal Virus Database: Potato black ringspot virus
Family Groups - The Baltimore Method

Nepoviruses
Viral plant pathogens and diseases